Smith Vocational and Agricultural High School is a four-year Career/Technical High School located in Northampton, Massachusetts, United States. Smith Vocational and Agricultural High School is a public high school for residents of Northampton and tuition students from all of Hampshire County. Students spend alternating weeks in shop and academic programs as they prepare for both a high school diploma and a Certificate of Occupational Proficiency.  The school is accredited by the New England Association of Schools and Colleges, and all shop programs meet state standards for vocational education programs.

History
Smith Vocational and Agricultural High School was established by a bequest from Oliver Smith. Smith was born in Hatfield, Massachusetts in 1766. He engaged in farming at an early age, and acquired large wealth by stock-raising. He was a magistrate for forty years; twice he was a representative to the legislature; and in 1820, he was a member of the State constitutional convention. His bequest for an Agricultural School became available for use in 1905, and the amount of $50,000 was turned over to the City of Northampton for the purchase of the  land for Smith School, which opened for students in 1908 as the first vocational school in Massachusetts.

Career-technical education
Smith Vocational offers students training in fifteen areas:
 Agriculture Mechanics
 Animal Science
 Auto Collision Repair
 Automotive Technology
 Cabinet Making 
 Carpentry
 Cosmetology
 Criminal Justice 
 Culinary Arts
 Electrical
 Graphic Communications
 Health Technology
 Horticulture/Forestry
 Manufacturing Technologies
 Plumbing Technology

References

External links
 

Buildings and structures in Northampton, Massachusetts
Public high schools in Massachusetts
Schools in Hampshire County, Massachusetts